The Ogden Osprey was a three engine, high wing monoplane airliner which seated six. Designed in the United States and first flown in the spring of 1930 or earlier, six were built and some used commercially before Ogden Aeronautical ceased trading in the Great Depression.

Design and development

The trimotor Osprey was a monoplane with a high, three-part wing of rectangular plan out to blunted tips. Its centre section contained two  fuel tanks and extended as far as the outer engines. The trailing edges of the outer panels were filled with narrow chord ailerons. The wing was built around twin spruce box spars with spruce ribs and was fabric covered, though its leading edges were spruce plywood. The outer panels were braced from the lower fuselage longerons by parallel pairs of struts to the spars which ran through the outer engine mountings. The engines were further braced with central struts to the upper longerons.

Ospreys were fitted with at least three engine types. The prototype, as well as several later examples, had  upright, air-cooled four cylinder Cirrus III engines and were designated Osprey Cs. Others had either  inverted, air-cooled four cylinder Menasco B-4 or its larger capacity,  development, the Menasco C-4. As all four cylinder Menascos were named Pirate, these two variants were designated Osprey PB and PC respectively. All were enclosed in neat cowlings.

Both the rectangular cross-section fuselage and tail had welded Cr/Mo steel tubes structures and were fabric covered. The  cabin accommodated six including a crew of one or two in the front row of side-by-side seats. The control column was of the throw-over type so it could be flown from either side. Alternatively, a fifth passenger could sit beside the pilot. The main landing wheels were equipped with differential brakes; a single settable lever between the front seat applied the required braking resistance but when the rudder pedal were operated the resistance was applied differentially. Cabin entry was by an angular door at the rear, where there was also a toilet. The tail surfaces were conventional with a triangular fin and tailplane, the latter mounted on top of the fuselage. The control surfaces were trapezoidal.

The axles and drag struts were mounted on the lower fuselage longerons and the original Bendix system had short, oleo strut shock-absorbing landing legs to the engine mountings. Alternatively, Goodyear Airwheels, large low pressure balloon tyres more suitable for soft field operations, were offered after the conclusion of successful trials in mid-1930.

Operational history

The date of the Osprey's first flight are not exactly known but was in or before the spring of 1930. By mid-summer its characteristics were well enough known for it to have also completed its programme with the Goodyear Airwheels. The dates of tests with the two later Menasco Pirate engine types are also not known. Before the financial failure of the Great Depression ended Ogden's company in 1933 it had built six Ospreys, including the prototype and at least two Menasco C-5 powered Osprey PCs. At least two Ospreys were operated commercially: photographs show NC-338V, an Osprey C with "SKY SIGN BROADCASTER" and NC150W, an Osprey PB with "CIA. NACIONAL AVIACION" on their fuselages. Compania Nacional de Aviacion (CNA) was a Guatemalan company.

Variants
Osprey C Powered by  upright, air-cooled four cylinder Cirrus III. At least one, the prototype. 
Osprey PB (a.k.a. Pirate) Powered by  inverted, air-cooled four cylinder Menasco B-4 Pirate.
Osprey PC Powered by  inverted, air-cooled four cylinder Menasco C-4 Pirate. At least two used commercially.

Specifications (Menasco B-4 Pirate engines)

References

High-wing aircraft
Three-engined aircraft
1930s United States civil aircraft